The Lions Clubs International Centennial silver dollar is a commemorative coin issued by the United States Mint in 2017.

References

2017 establishments in the United States
Modern United States commemorative coins